Armoured One is a U.S. based security and safety company with its focuses on protecting schools from an active shooter attack. The company conducts physical security risk assessments in schools, colleges, and universities to help mitigate security concerns.

History
Tom Czyz and Tino Amodei founded Armoured One in 2012 after the Sandy Hook attack took place on December 14, 2012. They brought together a team of experts in active shooting from SWAT Team members, elite military personnel, and federal agents with the intention of reducing the casualties happens in mass shootings.

See also
 Allied Universal
 G4S Secure Solutions
 Brinks Home Security

References

External links
 Official website

Business services companies established in 2012
Security companies of the United States
2012 establishments in the United States